Mahn Win Khaing Than (  and also spelled Mahn Win Khine Than or Mann Win Khaing Thann) is a Burmese politician and lawyer who is serving as the Prime Minister of the National Unity Government of Myanmar. An ethnic Karen, he served as the Speaker of the Assembly of the Union from 2016 to 2018 and the Speaker of the House of Nationalities on behalf of Kayin State from 2016 until his removal from office in the 2021 Myanmar coup d'état.

Early life

Mahn Win Khaing Than was born on 23 April 1952 in Hinthada Township, Ayeyarwady Division. He is an ethnic Karen and a Christian and also the grandson of Mahn Ba Khaing, who served as Minister for Industry and Minister for Labor in the pre-independence cabinet of the AFPFL government, and was assassinated alongside Aung San, the father of Aung San Suu Kyi on 19 July 1947 in the secretariat, Yangon. Mahn Win Khaing Than graduated from the Rangoon Arts and Science University with a law degree in 1975.

Career
He formerly served as the secretary of the Karen Literature and Culture Association, and joined the Union Karen League in 1990, which contested in the elections that same year. Then, he joined the National League for Democracy in 2013 and contested for the first time in the 2015 elections. In the 2015 election, he contested and won the Kayin State № 8 constituency for a seat in the country's upper house.

Following the 2021 Myanmar coup d'état on 1 February, Mahn Win Khaing Than went into hiding with fellow senior National League for Democracy officials who also escaped arrest.

On 9 March 2021, Mahn Win Khaing Than was named Acting Vice-President of Myanmar by the Committee Representing Pyidaungsu Hluttaw, a government in exile composed of ousted National League for Democracy lawmakers who won seats in the 2020 elections.

On 16 April 2021, Mahn Win Khaing Than was appointed as the Prime Minister of Myanmar (not as State Counsellor of Myanmar) by the Committee Representing Pyidaungsu Hluttaw as part of the newly-formed National Unity Government.

References

1952 births
Living people
Members of the House of Nationalities
Speakers of the House of Nationalities of Myanmar
National League for Democracy politicians
Burmese people of Karen descent
People from Ayeyarwady Region
Burmese Christians
20th-century Burmese lawyers